MotoGP 08 is a motorcycle racing video game. It is available for Microsoft Windows, Xbox 360, PlayStation 2, PlayStation 3, and Wii (simply called MotoGP in the U.S. version). For 2008, the rights to develop video games representing the MotoGP brand have been granted to a single publisher: Capcom. For the first time since MotoGP 4, the game includes the addition of playable 125cc and 250cc support classes. The Wii version of the game gives the player the option of using the Wii Remote as a handlebar, adding some lifelike control realism to the title.

Reception 

The game received "mixed or average reviews" on all platforms except the Wii version, which received "generally unfavorable reviews", according to the review aggregation website Metacritic. PcMag gave a 2.5/5 score, while Common Sense Media gave 3 stars out of 5. Independent said about MotoGP 08 that "there’s no doubt that if you’re a keen follower of MotoGP you won’t find a more complete experience, but that probably makes this one for the true fans". Gameplanet gave the game a 6.5/10 score, while PC World (AU) rated it with 4 stars out of 5.

References

External links 
 

2008 video games
Cancelled PlayStation Portable games
Capcom games
Grand Prix motorcycle racing video games
PlayStation 2 games
PlayStation 3 games
Racing video games
Video games developed in Italy
Wii games
Windows games
Xbox 360 games
Grand Prix motorcycle racing
Multiplayer and single-player video games
Video games set in Australia
Video games set in California
Video games set in China
Video games set in the Czech Republic
Video games set in England
Video games set in France
Video games set in Germany
Video games set in Indianapolis
Video games set in Italy
Video games set in Japan
Video games set in Malaysia
Video games set in the Netherlands
Video games set in Qatar
Video games set in Spain
Video games set in Portugal
Milestone srl games